The South Branch of the Baker River is a  river located in western New Hampshire in the United States. It is a tributary of the Baker River, part of the Pemigewasset River and Merrimack River watersheds.

The river rises in the town of Orange, New Hampshire, on high ground north of Mount Cardigan. It flows north through the southwest corner of the town of Groton and the eastern part of Dorchester, enters Wentworth, and drops rapidly to the Baker River.

See also

List of rivers of New Hampshire

References

Tributaries of the Merrimack River
Rivers of New Hampshire
Rivers of Grafton County, New Hampshire